Dolgiye Borody may refer to:

Dolgiye Borody (residence)
Dolgiye Borody (rural locality)